Linn Sem Stokke (born 18 September 1961) is a Norwegian actress, author, singer and composer.

She is the daughter of Ingebjørg Sem and Tor Stokke, both actors. She had her début at the National Theatre as a child, in 1975, and has since acted in over 25 productions there. Stokke became known to a national audience at a young age, in the role of the daughter in the sitcom Hjemme hos oss in 1980. She has also worked in international productions, such as Mio min Mio (1987) and the Swedish Om kärlek (1987) See UTUBE 

In 2006 Stokke released her first album, Unfolding, described as "jazz-inspired singer/songwriter-pop with more than a little hint of new age." In 2007 she was asked to compose and perform the signature melody for "Symposia 07 and the silent prayer for the earth"
These two songs, "Breathing Love" and "The New Day", are only available on iTunes  and  www.linnstokke.com
She has also written two books: Tanker fra en sorg (Thoughts from a grief) – a collection of poems – and the children's book Trollet Trym og den hemmelige farven, which has also been translated to Japanese. In 2006 the book was reprinted by GyldendalGood books. The book has also been filmed for television.  Linn lived for seven years with the actor Hans Ola Sørlie, who died in a car accident in 1988. She is currently married to the entrepreneur Atle Brynestad, and in 1997 quit her job at the National Theatre to "set her self free", as she said.  Stokke has two children with her first husband, and two with her second.

Select filmography

References

External links

Home page

1961 births
Living people
Norwegian stage actresses
Norwegian film actresses
Norwegian television actresses